Jocelyne Pérard ( Tournier; born June 6, 1940) is a French geographer. Her work focuses on tropical climatology, before devoting herself to the link between wine and climate in the context of climate change. President of the University of Burgundy (Dijon) from 1993 to 1998, she has been politically involved in the cultural development of wine in Dijon. Her work and commitment have been rewarded with numerous distinctions.

Biography
Jocelyne Tournier was born in Couternon, 1940. Her parents were of modest origin, her mother was a cleaning lady at the University of Burgundy and her grandparents were farmers, a milieu which she believes is the origin of her sensitivity to the land and to nature. Although she wanted to become an archaeologist, not having learned Greek, she turned to geography. She studied at the University of Burgundy where she was awarded the prize for the best geography student in 1962. In 1963, her graduate degree was entitled  (Commercialization of dairy products in the Dijon region). After receiving her Agrégée in geography, she left to teach high school in Pointe-à-Pitre, Guadeloupe, which led her to develop a passion for the tropical climate. 

She obtained her doctorate in 1984, entitled  (Research on the climates of the Malay Archipelago: the Philippines) under the direction of climatologist Pierre Pagney. At the time, there were no climatological databases, which made it difficult for Perard to do her research in Manila and Cotonou. It was with her thesis director that she initiated the French National Centre for Scientific Research (CNRS) at the University of Burgundy, which was very active in France in her discipline, and which she directed for a time. 

Pérard was elected president of the University of Burgundy from 1993 to 1998. At the time, she was one of the three women presidents of universities in France. Her term of office was marked by reforms in higher education, the Bayrou reform on examinations, and by changes in the policies of regional universities. At the end of her career, she was a professor of geography at this university. Pérard was named professor emeritus in 2015. She humorously mentioned in 2019 that wanting to be a winemaker, she became an academic, as the University of Burgundy owns a vineyard in Marsannay-la-Côte.

Approved in 2007, Pérard created and held the UNESCO Chair  (Culture and traditions of wine) at the University of Burgundy. It was the fourteenth in France, but original at the international level by the uniqueness of its subject, wine being spread all over the globe. The chair studies the entire wine chain, from the vine to tasting, from a multidisciplinary perspective14. This chair allows for academic exchanges and collaborations around the world in wine research. Perard was responsible for it until 2022; Unesco did not renew the chair in 2023.

Awards and honours
 Honorary doctorate, Johannes-Gutenberg University of Mainz
 Medal of honor from the city of Couternon
 Prize of the International Organization of Vine and Wine for Wine and Gastronomy
 Commander, Confrérie des Chevaliers du Tastevin
 Commander, Ordre des Palmes académiques
 Commander, Ordre national du Mérite (2015)
 Officer, Legion of Honour (2009); Knight, Legion of Honour (1997)

Selected works

Books

References

1940 births
Living people
French geographers
French climatologists
People from Côte-d'Or
Women geographers
University of Burgundy
Officiers of the Légion d'honneur
Chevaliers of the Légion d'honneur